Wander Johannes de Haas (2 March 1878 – 26 April 1960) was a Dutch physicist and mathematician. He is best known for the Shubnikov–de Haas effect, the De Haas–Van Alphen effect and the Einstein–de Haas effect.

Personal life
Wander de Haas was born in Lisse, a small town near Leiden. He was the son of Albertus de Haas, principal of the Teacher's College in Middelburg, and Maria Efting. On 22 December 1910 he married Geertruida Luberta Lorentz, the eldest daughter of Hendrik Lorentz. They had two daughters and two sons. He was an atheist.

Education
After attending high school in Middelburg, De Haas started paralegal studies in 1895. After completion of two of three parts of the examinations and having worked in a lawyer's office for some time, he decided to change career and become a physicist instead. After passing the qualifications exams for admission to University, he started to study physics at the University of Leiden in 1900 under Heike Kamerlingh Onnes and Johannes Petrus Kuenen. He earned his doctorate in 1912, under Kamerlingh Onnes, with a thesis entitled: Measurements on the Compressibility of Hydrogen.

Career
After getting his degree, De Haas worked in Berlin as a researcher at the Physikalische Reichsanstalt. Then he returned to the Netherlands, worked as a schoolteacher in Deventer, a conservator of the Teylers Museum in Haarlem, and then a physics professor in Delft Technical School and University of Groningen. In 1925, he became a professor in Leiden, and one of the two heads of the Laboratory of physics, succeeding Kamerlingh Onnes. In 1948, De Haas retired.

An example of the equipment (an electromagnet of c.1930) used for his low-temperature research can be seen in the Boerhaave Museum, the history of science museum in Leiden.

In 1922 he became member of the Royal Netherlands Academy of Arts and Sciences. Twenty years later, in 1942, he was forced to resign. After World War II ended in 1945, he was allowed to rejoin as a member.

References

External links
 de Haas' math genealogy
 Albert van Helden, Biography, Wander Johannes de Haas 1878–1960 (Digital Library of Royal Netherlands Academy of Arts and Sciences ). Originally published in: K. van Berkel, A. van Helden and L. Palm, ed., A History of Science in The Netherlands, Survey, Themes and Reference, pp. 454–456 (Leiden, Brill, 1999).
 Wander Johannes de Haas, 1878–1960 @ Instituut-Lorentz for theoretical physics
  J. van den Handel, Haas, Wander Johannes de (1878–1960), in Biografisch Woordenboek van Nederland.

1878 births
1960 deaths
Dutch atheists
20th-century Dutch physicists
Leiden University alumni
Academic staff of the Delft University of Technology
Academic staff of Leiden University
Members of the Royal Netherlands Academy of Arts and Sciences
People from Lisse